Adima Changala is a 1981 Indian Malayalam-language action-adventure film, directed by A. B. Raj and produced by R. S. Sreenivasan. The film stars Prem Nazir, Sheela, Swapna and Vishnuvardhan in the lead roles. The film has musical score by M. K. Arjunan. It is a remake of the 1969 Italian zapata Spaghetti Western film The Five Man Army. The train sequence in the movie is an excellently shot scene, especially for the '80s.

Cast
Prem Nazir
Sheela
Swapna
Vishnuvardhan
Jose Prakash
Balan K. Nair
Jayamalini

Soundtrack
The music was composed by M. K. Arjunan and the lyrics were written by R. K. Damodaran.

References

External links
 

1981 films
1980s Malayalam-language films
Indian action adventure films
Indian remakes of Italian films
Films directed by A. B. Raj